Isle of Fire was written by Wayne Thomas Batson and published in 2008 as the sequel to his book Isle of Swords.  These books are pirate fiction novels directed primarily at young adult readers and written from a Christian perspective.

Plot summary 
Declan Ross, accepting the British offer of pardons to pirates who would turn from their illegal trade, is now attempting to convince other pirates to do the same.  Meanwhile, rumors have arisen that Bartholomew Thorne, formerly thought to have been killed in a flood, is alive and plotting.

Cat, who has been staying with a group of monks for a time, has been offered the task of commanding a ship full of fighting monks on a mission to hunt down the elusive Merchant.  He accepts, and with Ross's permission, takes Anne on as quartermaster.

While Ross combs the sea for news of Thorne, Cat and Anne discover the Merchant's underwater lair.  Eventually, they are separated from their comrades and, in the ensuing battle with the Merchant himself, Anne escapes the lair while Cat is captured.  Anne is picked up by the Robert Bruce and Cat, trapped in a cell on the Merchant's ship, is faced with a choice: become the evil man's apprentice or die.  The Merchant arranges a meeting with Thorne himself and offers to return Cat to his father for a price.  Bartholomew, however, hatefully refuses.

Meanwhile, Lady Dolphin, Commodore Blake, and their young friend Hopper sail to an island where Thorne was reportedly last seen.  There the two adults are captured by the Raukar, Viking descendants who are under Thorne's leadership.  Hopper is able to rescue Blake but Lady Dolphin remains a prisoner.  While in Bartholomew's captivity, he and she discover that Dolphin is Thorne's daughter, the child of Heather, the wife he lost in a fire.  This news confounds the terrible pirate, who, while not fond of Dolphin, now cannot seem to stay away from her.

With a Viking army, Thorne sails to London and bombs it with a destructive and mysterious weapon of the Raukar: fire rain.  With vengeful satisfaction, Bartholomew wipes out and cripples the British Navy and watches the British city in burning confusion.  He then sails off to personally destroy the monastery Cat formerly stayed at.

Ross and Anne sail to defend the monastery as soon as they learn of Thorne's terrible work.  There before the monks' home, they confront Bartholomew in a sea battle, which further intensifies with the arrival of the Merchant's ship and a hurricane.  In the ensuing fight, Cat boldly escapes the Merchant's ship, that same vessel is soon sunk, Hopper and some of Ross's crewmen rescue Dolphin, and several Raukar ships are destroyed in the hurricane.  In a final confrontation on Ross's ship, Declan, Cat and Stede together kill Thorne.

The battered Robert Bruce and its crew ride out the rest of the hurricane in its eye and then return in triumph to the monastery.  As the story ends, London is struggling to recover and rebuild itself and Cat comes to Declan with a question.

Characters 
Declan Ross - Former pirate and captain of the Robert Bruce.  He is a brave, kind man who, even during his life of piracy, discouraged violence and promoted mercy.  Ross's wife Abigail died under mysterious circumstances when their daughter, Anne, was very young.

Anne Ross - Declan's daughter.  Red-headed, feisty and proud, she adores the perilous sailing life.

Cat - The disowned son of Bartholomew Thorne.  In this book he is struggling intensely with worry, sparked by physical and sometimes mental resemblances to his father, that he is becoming like the terrible pirate.  In spite of frequenting outbursts of anger, Cat is generally a friendly person who has become especially fond of Anne.  Though he lost most of his life's memories because of an injury, he is proving himself an adept seaman and a valiant fighter.

Bartholomew Thorne - The villain of this story.  His cruelty on land and at sea had earned him the reputation of one of the most notorious pirates of the Caribbean.  Because of a fire set by the English, Thorne's hands and voice were scarred and his favorite wife Heather was killed.  Chiefly because of the death of his wife, Thorne harbors a deadly, vengeful hatred against the British.

The Merchant - Hereditary title handed down a long line of evil men who, since the time of Emperor Nero, have been dealing in weapons, poisons, and other instruments of war.  The current Merchant, an extremely evil and deadly fighter, lives in an underwater network of tunnels creating a dangerous lair.  He hopes to train Cat, in whom he sees much potential for malice, to be his apprentice.

Commodore Blake - A brave Commodore in British Navy, who, though formerly Ross's enemy, has befriended Declan.  He loses his position, though, after some unexpected treachery from his former quartermaster.

Dolphin Blake - Friendly, spirited wife of Commodore Blake.  The orphaned woman is seeking to learn more about her uncertain past.

Hopper - Orphaned boy recently taken in by the Blakes.  Eager to please his new family and friends, he does all he can to be helpful to them.

Nigel - Blake's former quartermaster, who is secretly working for Thorne.
 
Hrothgar - Leader of the ancient Viking-like tribe of the Raukar.  He rallies his massive, primitive army under Thorne when the pirate calls for his help for an attack on England.

Edward Teach - Thorne's new quartermaster.

Stede - Declan Ross's quartermaster, an intensely loyal man with a pronounced accent and a fierce "thunder gun".

Scully - A ratlike little man who works for Thorne, chiefly as a messenger and spy.

Edmund Bellamy - Though not as feared as Thorne, Bellamy nonetheless is known as an evil and dangerous pirate.

Red Eye - A "powder monkey" on the Robert Bruce.  He is so named because of a reddish-tinged, blinded eye, the result of a past incident involving some gunpowder.  Though equipped with a fierce passion for all things sharp and dangerous, he a good friend and very faithful to Ross.

Jacques St. Pierre -  Master of all things explosive.  With a passion for "things that go BOOM!", this elegant yet naturally dangerous Frenchman is another member of Declan's crew.

Jules - Ross's largest and physically strongest crew member.  Like nearly all of the men on the Robert Bruce, he is very devoted to his captain and shipmates.

Nubby - The fierce, one-armed cook of the Robert Bruce.

King George - The German-speaking king of England who speaks very little English. Later known as King George I one of the greediest kings in Britain.

Cover 
The majority of the cover is a picture of a Viking-like ship sailing in the foreground and towards the back, dozens of docked, burning ships.  Beyond them a line of flame-assaulted buildings can be seen.  This is a portrayal of one of the final scenes in the story, in which the villain Thorne has set the docks of England ablaze.

While most versions of the book have a picture of a skull with two hammers crossed behind it (as well as a raven and an hourglass above each hammer) many online pictures show instead two crossed swords, creating the symbol seen on the cover of Isle of Swords.  The crossed hammers symbolize Thorne's new alliance with the Viking tribe of the Raukar, while the skull indicates the common theme of piracy in the book.  The raven represents the name of Thorne's previous ship and the hourglass most likely indicates the frequent instances, in the narrative, of time running out.

Isle of Swords
Isle of Swords, the first novel in the series, was published on September 11, 2007, by Thomas Nelson.

Sources
Information taken from:
Amazon page
Author's website

2008 American novels
Novels about pirates
American young adult novels
Children's historical novels
Novels set on islands
2008 children's books
American children's novels